The George Washington Noyes House is a historic house at 2 Prospect Terrace in Gorham, New Hampshire.  Completed in 1893, it is a prominent local example of Queen Anne architecture.  It was listed on the National Register of Historic Places in September 2016, and the New Hampshire State Register of Historic Places in April 2016.

Description and history
The George Washington Noyes House is located on a rise known as Soldier's Hill overlooking the Androscoggin River, northeast of the Gorham town common, on the north side of Prospect Terrace, a short spur road providing access to this house and to two other period houses.  The house is  stories in height, with a complex cross-gabled roof configuration and an exterior clad in a combination of wooden clapboards and decoratively cut shingles.  It has the asymmetrical look of a typical Queen Anne Victorian, with varying projecting sections and dormers.  An octagonal turret occupies the buildings southwest corner, rising three stories to a truncated octagonal roof with an iron crest railing at the top.  A single-story porch wraps across the front and around part of the right side, with turned posts and balusters, and a spindled valance.  The interior retains numerous period features, including woodwork and stained glass windows.

The house was built in 1891–93, after a fire devastated that part of Gorham in 1879.  It was built for George Washington Noyes, a worker on the Grand Trunk Railroad.  Noyes initially worked on the railroad as a laborer, and rose to become one of its master mechanics.  The house is one of three (all still standing) built on Soldier's Hill after the fire, and includes a well-preserved carriage barn with original hardware and finishes.

See also
National Register of Historic Places listings in Coos County, New Hampshire

References

Houses on the National Register of Historic Places in New Hampshire
Houses completed in 1893
Houses in Coös County, New Hampshire
National Register of Historic Places in Coös County, New Hampshire
New Hampshire State Register of Historic Places
Gorham, New Hampshire